Gwamhi-Wuri (Wurə-Gwamhyə-Mba), or Lyase, is a Kainji language of Nigeria. There are three varieties, which have only slight differences. "Lyase-Ne" means 'mother tongue'.

The Mba people, known in Hausa as Kokanawa, were recently reported by Blench (2012).

Names
Names for the languages and peoples:

References

Northwest Kainji languages
Languages of Nigeria